{{DISPLAYTITLE:C25H54ClN}}
The molecular formula C25H54ClN (molar mass: 404.16 g/mol) may refer to:

 Aliquat 336
 Behentrimonium chloride, also known as docosyltrimethylammonium chloride or BTAC-228

Molecular formulas